Cebu Water  is an investment agreement between the Provincial Government of Cebu (PGC),  and Manila Water Consortium where of 51 percent is owned by the consortium The agreement calls for the development and operation of  a water supply system that will supply 35 million liter of water per day to target cities and municipalities in the central and northern portions Cebu. The term of the agreement is 30 years starting in March 2012, renewable for another 25 year.

The Manila Water Consortium is  composed of Manila Water Company, Inc., Metro Pacific Water Investments Corporation, and Vicsal Development Company, Inc.,

The Cebu bulk water supply project is the first in Cebu to utilize a large-scale sustainable surface water source from Luyang River in  the municipality of Carmen, Cebu. It is expected to improve the current groundwater condition in Cebu which has deteriorated due to excessive use of deep wells.

Related Links 
 Manila Water Company
 Laguna Water
 Boracay Water
 Clark Water

References 

Water companies of the Philippines
Companies established in 2012
Companies based in Cebu City
Ayala Corporation subsidiaries
2012 establishments in the Philippines